Adhiyamaan College of Engineering (ACE) is an Autonomous Engineering college located  at Hosur, Tamil Nadu, India.

History

The college, started in 1987–88, is one of the educational institutions developed by Adhiyamaan Educational and Research Institution Trust. It is the first engineering college to be started in the most backward Dharmapuri District of the State of Tamil Nadu. It was originally affiliated to University of Madras. When Periyar University was carved out from the University of Madras, the colleges affiliation was changed to it. When the government of Tamil Nadu brought all the engineering and technical institutions in the State under one technological university in 2001, Adhiyamaan College of Engineering was affiliated to Anna University of Technology, Coimbatore. It is now affiliated to Anna University, Chennai. This college is the first private college to introduce the five-year Bachelor of Architecture degree course in Tamil Nadu, in the Name School Of Architecture.

Location
The college is housed on the Adhiyamaan Educational and Research Institutions campus, Dr. M.G.R Nagar, Hosur, Tamil Nadu, India. The campus is spread over  abutting National Highway NH-7. The nearest airport is Bengaluru International Airport.

Institution
The college is approved by the University Grants Commission as an autonomous institution and is accredited by the National Assessment and Accreditation Council (NAAC) as A grade. The college is certified with ISO 9001:2008. It is also  accredited by AICTE, NBA, New Delhi. The college has student chapters in ISTE, IE(I), IIPC, CSI and IET(UK).

Infrastructure

There are three hostels namely Pennar, Cauvery and Bhavani. The Pennar and Cauvery hostels are for the boys; Pennar is for the 1st year students and Cauvery for other seniors students. The Bhavani hostel is for the girls. The hostels have kitchen to provide wholesome food to the students. 
There are three canteen running inside the campus namely mgr canteen, main canteen, kamadhenu canteen. The college has library sections with books for all departments as well as technical and non-technical magazines. Computer labs, recreation rooms and sports facilities are also available. The college library is one of the biggest of its kind. It is one of the zonal leaders in sports.

Examination system
Each academic year is divided into two semesters. Each semester has three internal exams and one final exam (semester exam) for all theory subjects. For laboratory courses there is usually one internal exam followed by the final exam. Most of the exams are theoretical and have practical exams like most other engineering colleges in India.

References 

Engineering colleges in Tamil Nadu
Colleges affiliated to Anna University
Krishnagiri district